Hoskins is a surname.

Hoskins may also refer to:


United States 
 Hoskins, Nebraska, a village
 Hoskins, Oregon, an unincorporated community
 Fort Hoskins, Oregon, a US Army fort completed in 1857
 Hoskins Field (Texas), a baseball field
 Hoskins Field (Washington), a private airport

Papua New Guinea 
 Hoskins Rural LLG
 Hoskins, Papua New Guinea
 Hoskins Airport
 Cape Hoskins, Papua New Guinea

Antarctica 
 Hoskins Peak, Graham Land
 Mount Hoskins, Oates Land

See also 
 Hoskins effect, in immunology
 Haskins (disambiguation)